The Rīsthal inscription is a stone-slab inscription which was discovered in 1983 in the area of Rīsthal near Mandsaur in Madhya Pradesh, India.

The inscription describes the event in the year 515 CE, when the Aulikara king Prakashadharma of Malwa finally defeated the Alchon Huns ruler Toramana in his campaigns into Central India, and how he took away the tusks of his elephants and his harem.

The  portion of the inscription related to Toramana reads:

This ended the First Hunnic War in Indian territory, until Toramana's son Mihirakula would again attack Central India a few years later.

Full inscription
The purpose of the inscription is to record the construction of a tank, as well as the dedication of a Temple to Shiva by the Rajasthaniya Bagavaddosha in the reign of king Prakasadharma.

The inscription documents one of the Aulikaras royal houses, which comprised the following kings in the order of succession: Drumavardhana, Jayavardhana, Ajitavardhana, Vibhishanavardhana, Rajyavardhana and Prakashadharma (who defeated Toramana). In all probability, Yashodharman also belonged to this house and he was the son and successor of Prakashadharma.

References

Gupta and post-Gupta inscriptions